Clinohelea is a genus of biting midges in the family Ceratopogonidae. There are at least 40 described species in Clinohelea.

Species
These 43 species belong to the genus Clinohelea:

 Clinohelea albopennis Lane, 1944 c g
 Clinohelea argentina Lane & Duret, 1954 c g
 Clinohelea barrettoi Lane & Duret, 1954 c g
 Clinohelea bimaculata (Loew, 1861) i c g b
 Clinohelea bisignata (Kieffer, 1910) c
 Clinohelea curriei (Coquillett, 1905) i c g (=C. currei b)
 Clinohelea damascenoi Lane & Duret, 1954 c g
 Clinohelea dimidiata (Adams, 1903) i c g
 Clinohelea dryas Debenham, 1974 c g
 Clinohelea fallax Kieffer, 1917 c g
 Clinohelea flagellata (Edwards, 1916) c g
 Clinohelea fuscoalata Remm, 1993 c g
 Clinohelea hollandiae Tokunaga, 1966 c g
 Clinohelea horacioi Lane, 1944 c g
 Clinohelea hygropetrica Clastrier, 1983 c g
 Clinohelea insperata Meillon & Wirth, 1981 c g
 Clinohelea lacustris Macfie, 1939 c g
 Clinohelea longipalpis Kieffer, 1918 c g
 Clinohelea longitheca Grogan and Wirth, 1975 i c g
 Clinohelea muzoni Spinelli & Duret, 1993 c g
 Clinohelea neivai Lane, 1944 c g
 Clinohelea nigeriae Ingram & Macfie, 1923 c g
 Clinohelea nigripes Macfie, 1939 c g
 Clinohelea nubifera (Coquillett, 1905) i c g
 Clinohelea pachydactyla Kieffer, 1918 c g
 Clinohelea papuensis Tokunaga, 1966 c g
 Clinohelea podagrica Goetghebuer, 1948 c g
 Clinohelea pseudonubifera Grogan and Wirth, 1975 i c g
 Clinohelea reperticia Yu & Zhang, 1996 c g
 Clinohelea rubriceps Kieffer, 1917 c g
 Clinohelea saltanensis Lane & Duret, 1954 c g
 Clinohelea tasmaniensis Lee, 1948 c g
 Clinohelea tenuipes Tokunaga, 1966 c g
 Clinohelea tenuissima (Kieffer, 1917) c g
 Clinohelea townesi Lane, 1944 c g
 Clinohelea townsendi Lane, 1944 c g
 Clinohelea trimaculata Clastrier, 1983 c g
 Clinohelea unimaculata (Macquart, 1826) c g
 Clinohelea usheri Meillon, 1959 c g
 Clinohelea usingeri Wirth, 1952 i c g
 Clinohelea variegatus (Winnertz) i
 Clinohelea wygodzinskyi Lane, 1948 c g

Data sources: i = ITIS, c = Catalogue of Life, g = GBIF, b = Bugguide.net

References

Further reading

 
 
 

Ceratopogonidae
Articles created by Qbugbot
Chironomoidea genera
Taxa named by Jean-Jacques Kieffer